Amelia Montague Watson (1856–1934) was an American watercolorist well known for her work in Martha's Vineyard.

Biography

Born in East Windsor Hill, Connecticut on March 2, 1856, to Sarah (Bolles) and Reed Watson, she received a private education. Watson became a watercolorist.

Her younger sister, Edith, also painted watercolors and exhibited with Amelia, before becoming a successful photographer in Canada.

Career

She taught painting at a Martha's Vineyard summer school for twenty years in the last 19th century and exhibited in major east coast cities. In 1888 and 1889 she taught at the short-lived Martha's Vineyard Summer Institute. In a bulletin, the institute described her classes for the Department of Painting:

In 1894, Watson submitted a note regarding the taming of a chipping sparrow which was published in The Auk.

Watson produced a series of illustrations of scenes from Henry David Thoreau's "excursion" book, Cape Cod. Originally a gift for her companion Margaret Warner Morley, they were incorporated into an 1896 illustrated edition of the book published by Houghton Mifflin. A note in the book described "marginal sketches in color made by the artist as she read the successive chapters amid the scenes characterized by Thoreau. Thus she saw the sand, the lighthouse, the ocean, the sails, the fishermen, the weather-beaten houses, and when Thoreau threw in a Floridian contrast she was able happily to jot down a note in color from her own Florida sketches."

References

1856 births
1934 deaths
19th-century American painters
American women painters
19th-century American women artists
20th-century American painters
20th-century American women artists
People from South Windsor, Connecticut